Qabanqoli (also Romanized as Qābānqolī; also known as Qābān ‘Alī and Qabānglu) is a village in Pish Khowr Rural District, Pish Khowr District, Famenin County, Hamadan Province, Iran. According to the 2006 Census, there were 18 people total there, including 7 families.

References 

Populated places in Famenin County